Myrmarachne formicaria is a species of jumping spider (family Salticidae). It mimics an ant. It is one of the few species in the genus Myrmarachne that is found outside the tropics.

Name
The species name formicaria means "ant-like" in Latin.

Distribution
M. formicaria has a palearctic distribution and has been introduced to the United States. It was first recorded in the United States on 16 August 2001 in Trumbull County, Ohio. Since then, it has spread to Pennsylvania and New York.

References

External links

Salticidae
Spiders of Europe
Spiders described in 1778
Palearctic spiders